Penny Morales Shaw (born March 17, 1966) is an American attorney and politician. She has represented the 148th District in the Texas House of Representatives since 2021. Shaw is a member of the Democratic Party.

Career
Penny practiced law and spent several years in Washington, D.C. as congressional advocate for passing laws, including International Violence Against Women Act. Also served as legislative deputy chief for Harris County.

Elections
Penny ran for Harris County Commissioner Court in 2018, but lost with 48% of the vote in a close race. She also ran for the Texas House of Representatives District 148th seat in a special election in November 2019, but only came out to 8% of the vote. Anna Eastman won the special election in January 2020, and was seeking reelection later in the year for a full term. In the primaries, none of the five democratic candidates received the threshold to move on for the November 2020 election. Shaw and Eastman were the top two candidates and advance to a runoff election in July. In the democratic primary runoff, Shaw defeated Eastman in a close race only by less than 3 points (or 200 votes). Penny ran defeated Republican  Luis LaRotta in the general election with 63% of the vote.

References

External links
 Campaign website
 State legislative page

1966 births
Living people
Democratic Party members of the Texas House of Representatives
Hispanic and Latino American state legislators in Texas
Hispanic and Latino American women in politics
Women state legislators in Texas
21st-century American politicians
21st-century American women politicians
People from Houston
American lawyers
Texas lawyers